Michael O'Brien (born 1999) is an Irish hurler who plays for the Limerick Senior Championship club Doon and at inter-county level with the Limerick senior hurling team. He usually lines out as a left wing-back.

Honours
Doon
Limerick Premier Minor Hurling Championship (1): 2015

References

1999 births
Living people
Doon hurlers
Limerick inter-county hurlers